Felix Howard (born January 14, 1973) is a songwriter, record producer, A&R and publisher.

A former model as a child, Howard was photographed by Jamie Morgan and styled by the world renowned Ray Petri for the cover of The Face magazine. In 1987, he was in the Madonna video "Open Your Heart", and also appeared in the Mantronix video for "Got to Have Your Love".

His songwriting credits include working alongside Amy Winehouse, Sia, The Sugababes among many others. In 2007, he joined EMI Publishing as an A&R manager where he signed Calvin Harris, Lana Del Rey, MNEK, James Vincent McMorrow, Tinchy Stryder, Sam Sparro, Hurts, Beverley Knight, Tom Jones, and many others.

In 2008, Felix Howard was made VP, A&R at EMI and in 2009 he was made head of A&R EMI UK and Europe Creative.

After leaving EMI before the Sony merger, he went on to consult for Daniel Lieberberg at Universal Records and was involved with the Klangkarussell album and signed Lewis Capaldi with Lieberberg.

Previously, Howard was Director of A&R for the US division of Budde Publishing in Los Angeles. Howard worked at Method Management in an A&R role. In December 2020, Howard joined BMG as Director A&R (New Recordings) in London, UK. At BMG, Howard has worked with Gabrielle, Ultra Nate, Katie Melua, Louis Tomlinson, Zak Abel and Lady Blackbird. 

As a child, Howard had systemic-onset juvenile idiopathic arthritis and was a patient at Great Ormond Street Hospital under Barbara Ansell. He has vitiligo and what he has called "a number of extremely tiresome and dull auto immune illnesses".. 
Howard has two children  and lives in London and California. In October 2021, Howard married actress/producer/writer Andrea Lewis. He supports Chelsea FC.

Selected discography

Songwriting credits
2000 - Overload - Sugababes
2001 - One Touch - Sugababes
2002 - Stronger/Angels with Dirty Faces - Sugababes
2002 - Healing Is Difficult - Sia
2002 - Footprints - Holly Valance
2003 - Three - Sugababes (also played guitar)
2003 - The Number One Jazz Album 2004
2003 - Play with Me - Lene
2003 - Frank - Amy Winehouse	(also producer, engineer, background vocals)
2004 - Remixes 1 - Sia
2004 - In the Middle - Sugababes
2004 - In My Bed - Amy Winehouse
2004 - Colour the Small One - Sia (also played acoustic guitar)
2004 - Body Language - Kylie Minogue
2004 - Affirmation - Beverley Knight
2005 - Fundacion NYC - Sasha
2006 - Back to Black - Amy Winehouse
2006 - Rehab - Amy Winehouse (also producer)
2007 - Lady Croissant - Sia
2008 - Bent Out of Shape - Leon Jean-Marie (also producer and instrumentation)
2014 - War Room Stories - Breton (also executive producer)
2014 - Netzwerk - Klangkarussell

References

External links
 Discography
 AllMusic
 IMDB
 Feature on Felix Howard
 Interview with Felix Howard

British record producers
Living people
1973 births